A nuclear family, elementary family, cereal-packet family or conjugal family is a family group consisting of parents and their children (one or more), typically living in one home residence. It is in contrast to a single-parent family, the larger extended family, or a family with more than two parents. Nuclear families typically center on a heterosexual married couple which may have any number of children. There are differences in definition among observers. Some definitions allow only biological children that are full-blood siblings and consider adopted or half and step siblings a part of the immediate family, but others allow for a step-parent and any mix of dependent children, including stepchildren and adopted children. Most sociologists and anthropologists consider the nuclear family as the most basic form of social organization, while others consider the extended family structure to be the most common family structure in most cultures and at most times.

The term nuclear family was popularized in the 20th century. In the United States, it became the most common form of family structure in the 1950s, 1960s and 1970s. Since that time, the number of North American nuclear families is gradually decreasing, while the number of alternative family formations has increased; this phenomenon is generally opposed by members of such philosophies as social conservatism or familialism, which consider the nuclear family structure important.

History
DNA extracted from bones and teeth discovered in a 4,600-year-old Stone Age burial site in Germany has provided the earliest evidence for the social recognition of a family consisting of two parents with multiple children.

Historians Alan Macfarlane and Peter Laslett, among other European researchers, say that nuclear families have been a primary arrangement in England since the 13th century. This primary arrangement was different from the normal arrangements in Southern Europe, in parts of Asia, and the Middle East where it was common for young adults to remain in or marry into the family home. In England, multi-generational households were uncommon because young adults would save enough money to move out, into their own household once they married. Sociologist Brigitte Berger argued, "the young nuclear family had to be flexible and mobile as it searched for opportunity and property. Forced to rely on their own ingenuity, its members also needed to plan for the future and develop bourgeois habits of work and saving." Berge also mentions that this could be one of the reasons why the Industrial Revolution began in England and other Northwest European countries. However, the historicity of the nuclear family in England has been challenged by Cord Oestmann.

Family structures of a married couple and their children were present in Western Europe and New England in the 17th century, influenced by church and theocratic governments. With the emergence of proto-industrialization and early capitalism, the nuclear family became a financially viable social unit.

Usage of the term
The term nuclear family first appeared in the early 20th century. Merriam-Webster dates the term back to 1924, while the Oxford English Dictionary has a reference to the term from 1925; thus it is relatively new.  While the phrase dates approximately from the Atomic Age, the term "nuclear" is not used here in the context of nuclear warfare, nuclear power, nuclear fission or nuclear fusion; rather, it arises from a more general use of the noun nucleus, itself originating in the Latin nux, meaning "nut", i.e. the core of something – thus, the nuclear family refers to all members of the family being part of the same core rather than directly to atomic weapons.

In its most common usage, the term nuclear family refers to a household consisting of a father, a mother and their children all in one household dwelling. George Murdock, an observer of families, offered an early description: 

Many individuals are part of two nuclear families in their lives: the family of origin in which they are offspring, and the family of procreation in which they are a parent.

Alternative definitions have evolved to include family units headed by same-sex parents and perhaps additional adult relatives who take on a cohabiting parental role; in the latter case, it also receives the name of conjugal family.

Compared with extended family

An extended group consists of non-nuclear (or "non-immediate") family members considered together with nuclear (or "immediate") family members. When extended family is involved they also influence children's development just as much as the parents would on their own. In an extended family resources are usually shared among those involved, adding more of a community aspect to the family unit. This is not limited to the sharing of objects and money, but includes sharing time. For example, extended family such as grandparents can watch over their grandchildren allowing parents to continue and pursue careers and creating a healthy and supportive environment the children to grow up in and allows the parents to have much less stress. Extended families help keep the kids in the family healthier because of all the resources the kids get now that they have other individuals able to help them and support them as they grow up.

Changes to family formation

In 2005, information from the United States Census Bureau showed that 70% of children in the US live in two-parent families, with 66% of those living with parents who were married, and 60% living with their biological parents. The information also explained that "the figures suggest that the tumultuous shifts in family structure since the late 1960s have leveled off since 1990".

When considered separately from couples without children, single-parent families, and unmarried couples with children, the United States nuclear families appear to constitute a minority of households – with a rising prevalence of other family arrangements. In 2000, nuclear families with the original biological parents constituted roughly 24.10% of American households, compared with 40.30% in 1970. Roughly two-thirds of all children in the United States will spend at least some time in a single-parent household. According to some sociologists, "[The nuclear family] no longer seems adequate to cover the wide diversity of household arrangements we see today." (Edwards 1991; Stacey 1996). A new term has been introduced, postmodern family, intended to describe the great variability in family forms, including single-parent families and couples without children." Nuclear family households are now less common compared to household with couples without children, single-parent families, and unmarried couples with children.

In the UK, the number of nuclear families fell from 39.0% of all households in 1968 to 28.0% in 1992. The decrease accompanied an equivalent increase in the number of single-parent households and in the number of adults living alone.

Professor Wolfgang Haak of Adelaide University, detects traces of the nuclear family in prehistoric Central Europe. A 2005 archeological dig in Elau in Germany, analyzed by Haak, revealed genetic evidence suggesting that the 13 individuals found in a grave were closely related. Haak said, "By establishing the genetic links between the two adults and two children buried together in one grave, we have established the presence of the classic nuclear family in a prehistoric context in Central Europe.... Their unity in death suggest[s] a unity in life." This paper does not regard the nuclear family as "natural" or as the only model for human family life. "This does not establish the elemental family to be a universal model or the most ancient institution of human communities. For example, polygamous unions are prevalent in ethnographic data and models of household communities have apparently been involving a high degree of complexity from their origins."

Lastly, large shifts in the financial landscape for families has made the historically middle class, traditional, nuclear family structure significantly more risky, expensive and unstable. The expenses associated with raising a family; notably housing, medical care and education, have all increased very rapidly, particularly since the 1950s. Since then middle class incomes have stagnated or even declined, whilst living costs have soared to the point where even two-income households are now unable to offer the same level of financial stability that was once possible under the single income nuclear family household of the 1950s.

Effect on family size
As a fertility factor, single nuclear family households generally have a higher number of children than co-operative living arrangements according to studies from both the Western world and India.

There have been studies done that shows a difference in the number of children wanted per household according to where they live. Families that live in rural areas wanted to have more kids than families in urban areas. A study done in Japan between October 2011 and February 2012 further researched the effect of area of residence on mean desired number of children. Researchers of the study came to the conclusion that the women living in rural areas with larger families were more likely to want more children, compared to women that lived in urban areas in Japan.

"Traditional" North American family

For social conservatism in the United States and Canada, the idea that the nuclear family is traditional is a very important aspect, where family is seen as the primary unit of society. These movements oppose alternative family forms and social institutions that are seen by them to undermine parental authority. The numbers of nuclear families is slowly dwindling in the US as more women pursue higher education, develop professional lives, and delay having children until later in their life. Children and marriage have become less appealing as many women continue to face societal, familial, and/or peer pressure to give up their education and career to focus on stabilizing the home. As diversity in the United States continues to increase, it is becoming difficult for the traditional nuclear family to stay the norm. Data from 2014 also suggests that single parents and the likelihood of children living with one is also correlated with race. Pew Research Center has found that 54% of African-American individuals will be single parents compared to only 19% of White individuals. Several factors account for the differences in family structure including economic and social class. Differences in education level also change the amount of single parents. In 2014, those with less than a high school education are 46% more likely to be a single parent compared to 12% who have graduated from college.

Critics of the term "traditional family" point out that in most cultures and at most times, the extended family model has been most common, not the nuclear family, though it has had a longer tradition in England than in other parts of Europe and Asia which contributed large numbers of immigrants to the Americas.  The nuclear family became the most common form in the U.S. in the 1960s and 1970s.

The concept that narrowly defines a nuclear family as central to stability in modern society that has been promoted by familialists who are social conservatives in the United States, and has been challenged as historically and sociologically inadequate to describe the complexity of actual family relations. In "Freudian Theories of Identification and Their Derivatives" Urie Bronfenbrenner states, "Very little is known about the extent variation in the behavior of fathers and mothers towards sons and daughters, and even less about the possible effects on such differential treatment." Little is known about how parental behavior and identification processes work, and how children interpret sex role learning. In his theory, he uses "identification" with the father in the sense that the son will follow the sex role provided by his father and then for the father to be able to identify the difference of the "cross sex" parent for his daughter.

See also

 Astronaut family
 Clan
 Complex family
 Family relationships
 Family values
 Hajnal line
 Human bonding
 Immediate family
 Intentional community
 Joint family
 
 Origins of society
 Sociology of the family
 Structural functionalism

References

External links
 The Nuclear Family from Buzzle.com
 Early Human Kinship was Matrilineal by Chris Knight. (anthropological debates as to whether the nuclear family is natural and universal).

Family
Living arrangements
Social conservatism